Lewis R. (Lou) Grosenbaugh (November 4, 1913 – April 22, 2003) was a prominent U.S. Forest Service researcher and head of the Forest Service's first Pioneering Research Unit, in forest mensuration, in Berkeley, California. Known for his contributions to the fields of forest inventory, forest measurement, and forest management, Grosenbaugh built on Walter Bitterlich's idea of estimating the density of a forest with timber cruising so that individual trees could be used to estimate various stand measures, such as volume per acre.

Career 

 1936. U.S. Forest Service Junior Forester on the Ouachita National Forest
 1938 timber management assistant and assistant forester, Ozark National Forest
 1941 U.S. Naval Reserve, highest rank Lieutenant Commander
 1946 Associate Forester, National Forests in Florida
 1946 Silviculturist, Southern Forest Experiment Station, New Orleans
 1951 Division Chief of Forest Management Research, Forest Genetics Research, Forest Fire Research, Forest Pathology Research and Watershed Management Research
 1960 Research Forester and head, Pioneering Research Unit—Mensuration, Berkeley, California
 1968 head, Pioneering Research Unit—Mensuration, Atlanta, Georgia
 1974 Retired, U.S. Forest Service
 1977 Adjunct Professor, University of Florida School of Forest Resources and Conservation

Legacy
A notable contribution of Grosenbaugh was adapting Bitterlich's techniques to forest inventories throughout the US. Grosenbaugh promoted the findings of European foresters and brought them the researchers and foresters in the US.

Grosenbaugh had pioneered many original thoughts during his work in statistical sampling of trees in forests, including subsampling trees to obtain a volume to basal area ratio.

References

Forestry academics
1913 births
2003 deaths
American foresters
Yale College alumni
Dartmouth College alumni